Kurixalus wangi is a species of tree frog in the family Rhacophoridae. It is endemic to Taiwan and occurs in the southernmost part of the island. Prior to its description in 2016, it was confused with Kurixalus eiffingeri. The specific name wangi honors Wang Ching-Shong, a pioneering herpetologist from Taiwan.

Taxonomy and systematics
Kurixalus wangi was described in 2016. It resembles Kurixalus eiffingeri but displays some morphological differences and a different reproductive season. Furthermore, molecular data and male advertisement call differentiate it from Kurixalus eiffingeri and Kurixalus berylliniris, its sister species. Together these three species form a lineage that is clearly separate from Kurixalus idiootocus, the fourth Kurixalus species in Taiwan.

Description
Adult males measure  and adult females  in snout–vent length. The overall appearance is slender with flat body. The head is wider than it is long. The snout is subovoid with pointed tip in dorsal view and acuminate and slightly protruding in profile. The canthus rostralis is distinct and rounded. The tympanum is distinct, less than half of the eye diameter, with its upper margin covered by the supratympanic fold. The limbs are moderately robust. The finger and toe tips are expanded into discs. The fingers have a trace of webbing and the toes are moderately webbed. Dorsal skin is shagreened, ventral skin is slightly granular. The dorsal coloration varies from light brown with distinctly dark markings (including a dark X-like marking) to almost uniformly light green. The iris is golden-yellow.

Distribution
This species occurs in southernmost Taiwan in Pingtung County.

Habitat and conservation
Kurixalus wangi occurs in the shrubs of secondary forests and lowland broad-leaved forests at elevations below . Eggs have been found in small pools in tree hollows and man-made structures (discarded plastic cups and plastic pipes), either above the water or submerged. The tadpoles are oophagous.

, this species had not been included in the IUCN Red List of Threatened Species.

References

wangi
Amphibians of Taiwan
Endemic fauna of Taiwan
Amphibians described in 2016